Copper silicate may refer to any silicate of copper generally; more specifically:

Minerals
Apachite, a copper silicate mineral with a general formula of Cu9Si10O29·11H2O
Dioptase, a cyclosilicate mineral - CuSiO3·H2O 
Gilalite, a copper silicate mineral with chemical composition of Cu5Si6O17·7(H2O).
Plancheite, a hydrated copper silicate mineral with the formula Cu8Si8O22(OH)4•(H2O)
Shattuckite, a copper silicate hydroxide mineral with formula Cu5(SiO3)4(OH)2
Chrysocolla is a hydrated copper phyllosilicate mineral (with aluminum) with formula: Cu2−Al(H2−Si2O5)(OH)4·H2O (<1)

Mixed metal copper silicate minerals
Abswurmbachite, a copper manganese silicate mineral
Ajoite is a hydrated sodium potassium copper aluminium silicate hydroxide mineral
Ashburtonite, a rare lead copper silicate-bicarbonate mineral 
Iranite (Persian: ایرانیت), a lead copper chromate silicate mineral
Kinoite, a copper silicate mineral with calcium
Larimar, also called "Stefilia's Stone", is a rare blue variety of the silicate mineral pectolite that contains copper
Papagoite,  rare cyclosilicate mineral - calcium copper aluminium silicate hydroxide
Scottyite, a barium copper silicate

Pigments
Egyptian blue, also known as calcium copper silicate or cuprorivaite, a pigment used in ancient Egypt
Han purple and Han blue, also called Chinese purple and Chinese blue,  synthetic barium copper silicate pigments developed in China and used in ancient and imperial China onwards

See also
Copper silicide